Laminacauda newtoni is a species of sheet weaver found in Chile and Argentina. It was described by Millidge in 1985.

References

Linyphiidae
Invertebrates of Argentina
Spiders of South America
Spiders described in 1985